The 2021 UAE Tour was a road cycling stage race that took place between 21 and 27 February 2021 in the United Arab Emirates. It was the third edition of the UAE Tour and the first race of the 2021 UCI World Tour.

Teams 
All nineteen UCI WorldTeams were joined by one UCI ProTeam to make up the twenty teams that participated in the race.

UCI WorldTeams

 
 
 
 
 
 
 
 
 
 
 
 
 
 
 
 
 
 
 

UCI ProTeams

Route

Stages

Stage 1 
21 February 2021 — Al Dhafra Castle to Al Mirfa,

Stage 2 
22 February 2021 – Al Hudayriat Island,  (ITT)

After a round of COVID-19 testing on 21 February returned a positive result for an  staff member, the entire team, including overnight race leader Mathieu van der Poel, withdrew from the race. Consequently, David Dekker, who was second overall, wore the red jersey of the leader of the general classification on Stage 2. He was due to wear the white jersey of the leader of the young rider classification, but that jersey was worn by Tadej Pogačar, who was third in the young rider classification, as the second-placed young rider, João Almeida, wore the green jersey of the leader of the points classification, which had also been led by van der Poel. Almeida had been leading the sprints classification, so the black jersey was worn by second-placed Mattia Cattaneo.

Stage 3 
23 February 2021 – Al Ain to Jebel Hafeet,

Stage 4 
24 February 2021 – Al Marjan Island to Al Marjan Island,

Stage 5 
25 February 2021 – Fujairah City to Jebel Jais,

Stage 6 
26 February 2021 – Deira Islands to Palm Jumeirah,

Stage 7 
27 February 2021 – Yas Mall to Abu Dhabi,

Classification leadership table 

 On stage 2, David Dekker, who was second in the general classification, wore the red jersey, because first-placed Mathieu van der Poel had withdrawn from the race after an  staff member tested positive for COVID-19. Dekker, who was first in the young rider classification, was originally supposed to wear the white jersey, but it was instead worn by third-placed Tadej Pogačar, as second-placed João Almeida wore the green jersey as the temporary leader of the points classification, which had also been led by van der Poel.
 On stages 2 and 3, Mattia Cattaneo, who was second in the sprints classification, wore the black jersey, because first-placed João Almeida wore the green jersey.
 On stages 3 and 4, Neilson Powless, who was third in the young rider classification, wore the white jersey, because first-placed Tadej Pogačar wore the red jersey as the leader of the general classification, while second-placed João Almeida wore the green jersey on stage 3 and the black jersey on stage 4. For the same reasons, on stage 4, Filippo Ganna, who is third in the points classification, wore the green jersey.
 On stages 5 to 7, João Almeida, who was second in the young rider classification, wore the white jersey, because first-placed Tadej Pogačar wore the red jersey as the leader of the general classification. For the same reason, on stage 6, David Dekker, who was second in the points classification, wore the green jersey.

Final classification standings

General classification

Points classification

Sprints classification

Young rider classification

Team classification

References

Sources

External links
 

2021
UAE Tour
UAE Tour
UAE Tour